True Patriot Love Foundation is a Canadian national, Toronto-based charity dedicated to supporting Canadian military members, veterans and their families.  It has committed more than $28-million to 825 community-based programs across Canada since 2009 which has helped change the lives of 30,000 military members, Veterans and families. The foundation raises awareness around the challenges related to military service on a national level and funds programs in local communities to support health and well-being, enable rehabilitation & recovery from injury, assist the children and spouses of those who serve, and promote re-integration into communities following service.

Notable Initiatives 
Vets Canada is receiving funds from the foundation and has used these funds to create the Captain Nichola Goddard support initiative for in-crisis and/or homeless female veterans.

The True Patriot Love Foundation has launched a pilot project to help female Canadian veterans transition back into civilian life by partnering with Canadian private security firm, Gardaworld.

The foundation partnered with Rick Hillier, retired general and a former chief of the defence staff of the Canadian Forces, in making of a documentary film Forged In Stone.

Eight injured Canadian soldiers have travelled to summit Mount Vinson Massif in Antarctica, the highest peak in the continent. The expedition was also made up of 15 Canadian business leaders and five team specialists. The business leaders were meant to serve as mentors to the veterans. Out of 26 individuals in the expedition twenty reached the summit. The team has raised more than $2 Million for Canadian Veterans.

References 

Charities based in Canada
Foundations based in Canada
Organizations based in Toronto
2008 establishments in Ontario
Canadian veterans' organizations
Organizations established in 2008